The Dead River is a tributary of the Saint George River in the U.S. state of Maine.

See also
List of rivers of Maine

References

Maine Streamflow Data from the USGS
Maine Watershed Data From Environmental Protection Agency

Rivers of Maine
Geography of Waldo County, Maine
Geography of Knox County, Maine